Cagliari Elmas Airport  is an international airport located in the territory of Elmas, near Cagliari, on the Italian island of Sardinia.

History

The airport opened on 3 May 1937. It was upgraded in 2003 and the terminal was expanded and provided with 6 jetbridges for passenger boarding, with a capacity of 4 million passengers per year. In 2018, the airport handled 4,370,014 passengers. It was named in 1937 after Mario Mameli, a bomber pilot from the fascist-era Italian airforce shot down in the Second Italo-Ethiopian War.

Airlines and destinations
The following airlines operate regular scheduled and charter flights at Cagliari Elmas Airport:

Statistics

Ground transportation
The airport is about 7 km from Cagliari city centre.
A railway station serving the airport enables connections to most Sardinian towns.

References

External links

 
 

Airports in Sardinia
Transport in Cagliari
Airfields of the United States Army Air Forces in Italy
Airports established in 1937
1937 establishments in Italy